Arthur Bentley (1871 – after 1897) was an English footballer who played in the Football League for Stoke.

Career
Bentley was born in Stoke-upon-Trent and played for Sandbach Ramblers before joining Stoke in 1896. He played in five matches during the 1896–97 season. He was released and the end of the season and re-joined Sandbach Ramblers.

Career statistics

References

1871 births
Year of death missing
Footballers from Stoke-on-Trent
English footballers
Association football inside forwards
Sandbach Ramblers F.C. players
Stoke City F.C. players
English Football League players